Boz Hal (also Romanized as Bozhol) is a village in Hemmatabad Rural District, in the Central District of Borujerd County, Lorestan Province, Iran. At the 2006 census, its population was 38, in 11 families.

References 

Towns and villages in Borujerd County